Élan • Impulse is a live duet album by multi-instrumentalist and composer Joe McPhee, recorded in 1991 and released on the French In Situ label.

Reception

Allmusic states "This duo digs deep into the spirit of a particular night in France and calls out of it the entire improvisational tradition from Duke Ellington (whose "Come Sunday" is featured here) to Steve Lacy (whose "Pearl Street" is played movingly) and the host of time periods in between... This is an astonishing record. Period".

Track listing 
All compositions by Joe McPhee except as indicated
 "Reason I" - 7:47
 "Logic Circles" - 7:44
 "Pearl Street" (Steve Lacy) - 8:53
 "Sand Dancer" - 2:19
 "Come Sunday" (Duke Ellington) - 7:49
 "Reason II" - 5:03
 "Joker" - 7:23
 "Cordered" - 3:44
 "Reason III" - 6:20
 "Arcs" - 4:50

Personnel 
Joe McPhee - tenor saxophone, soprano saxophone, valve trombone, voice
Daunik Lazro - alto saxophone, baritone saxophone

References 

Joe McPhee live albums
1979 live albums